Capturing Bad Bill is a 1915 American silent comedy film featuring Oliver Hardy.

Cast
 Raymond McKee as Pete Pepper
 Mabel Paige as Mary Pepper
 Ben Walker as The Mayor
 Oliver Hardy as Member of the posse (as Babe Hardy)

See also
 List of American films of 1915
 Oliver Hardy filmography

External links

1915 films
American silent short films
American black-and-white films
1915 comedy films
1915 short films
Silent American comedy films
American comedy short films
1910s American films